The Grey Lynn by-election 1963 was a by-election held in the  electorate in Auckland during the term of the 33rd New Zealand Parliament, on 18 May 1963.

The by-election was caused by the death of incumbent MP Fred Hackett of the Labour Party on 19 March 1963. The by-election was won by Reginald Keeling, also of the Labour Party.

Background
Fred Hackett had represented Grey Lynn since  when he defeated John A. Lee. Hackett had been ill for some time and was admitted to Auckland Hospital on 25 July 1962 for an operation on his brain, which saved his life. Following the operation he gradually recovered and was discharged in early September. As a result of his health he intended to step down as Deputy Leader of the Opposition, however he did intend to stay in parliament and had already been re-selected to contest Grey Lynn at the upcoming 1963 election, but died on 19 March.

Candidates
Communist Party
George Jackson contested the seat for the Communist Party of New Zealand (CPNZ). An orchardist by profession, he was Chairman of the CPNZ at the time.

Labour Party
The Labour Party initially intended for its candidate selected for the by-election to also be for the candidate for Grey Lynn under the newly drawn boundaries which were to come into force for the general election at the end of the year. As a result this would mean Ritchie Macdonald, the incumbent MP for the soon to be abolished  seat, would be unable to contest the selection without resigning in Ponsonby and therefore triggering another by-election. Labour made a similar decision for the selection in the Otahuhu by-election several months earlier. Labour reversed this decision several weeks later as the result of a new ruling from the national executive of the party to hold separate selections for the by-election and general election.

Several names were put forward as candidates including:
Alex Dreaver, a member of the Auckland City Council since 1953 – son of Mary Dreaver
Ritchie Macdonald, MP for  since 1946
Thomas Price, a Labour candidate for the Auckland City Council in 1962 and a 1963 by-election

The selection meeting was held on 25 April in the West Lynn Boys' Club Hall in front of a large gathering of branch members. The selection for the general election was held first followed by the "caretaker" selection. Labour selected Macdonald and Keeling as their candidates for the general election and by-election respectively. After missing out on the first selection, Finlay did not contest the by-election ballot. Only a week earlier he had been selected to stand in the  electorate at the general election later in the year and was thus only a stand in until then. Macdonald, who had represented the neighbouring Ponsonby since 1949, won selection to contest Grey Lynn in the subsequent general election. Large portions of Ponsonby were transferred to Grey Lynn.

National Party
Raymond John Presland was chosen to contest the seat for the National Party. He had contested  for National in 1960. Several months earlier he had unsuccessfully sought the National nomination at another by-election in Otahuhu. An importer by trade, he was the sole nominee for the party candidacy.

Social Credit
William Alexander "Bill" Ross stood for the Social Credit Party. He was a building contractor and previously an executive member of the Auckland Carpenters' Union.

Campaign
The by-election was noted for its lack of interest from the public. The total of attendances to campaign meetings did not exceed 290 and most meetings were over in less than 90 minutes with only one or two questions from the floor. The overwhelming majority of attendees were either middle-aged or elderly. Only Keeling and Presland held meetings, the Communist and Social Credit parties did not even hold public gatherings. Four cabinet ministers travelled to the electorate to campaign for Presland. Labour MPs from four neighboring electorates as well as the Deputy Leader of the Opposition Hugh Watt campaigned on behalf of Keeling. The campaign finished on the evening of 17 May with speeches from the Prime Minister Keith Holyoake and Leader of the Opposition Arnold Nordmeyer.

Results
The following table gives the election results:

Aftermath
Keeling retained the seat for Labour in a low turnout poll. Keeling did not stand for Grey Lynn at the 1963 general election, standing instead in  where he was defeated. Both Jackson and Ross contested Grey Lynn again in 1963.

Notes

References

Grey Lynn 1963
1963 elections in New Zealand
Politics of the Auckland Region
May 1963 events in New Zealand
1960s in Auckland